Allyltestosterone, or 17α-allyltestosterone, also known as 17α-allylandrost-4-en-17β-ol-3-one, is a steroid derived from testosterone that was first synthesized in 1936 and was never marketed. Along with propyltestosterone (topterone), it has been patented as a topical antiandrogen and hair growth inhibitor. Allyltestosterone is the parent structure of two marketed 19-nortestosterone progestins, allylestrenol and altrenogest. These progestins are unique among testosterone derivatives in that they appear to be associated with few or no androgenic effects.

See also 
 Steroidal antiandrogen
 List of steroidal antiandrogens
 Allylnortestosterone
 Ethinyltestosterone
 Vinyltestosterone

References 

Abandoned drugs
Tertiary alcohols
Allyl compounds
Androstanes
Enones
Steroidal antiandrogens